Lorraine Cole (born 20 September 1967) is a retired English badminton player.

About 
Cole is a former badminton player who also played Javelins throw in her early junior career. She attended Kings Norton Mixed School and won English schools U-17 National Javelin championships and later became the English Junior Javelin champion. Afterwards she opted badminton for her career and won the Worcester county badminton title. She then won the National championships and once stood amidst the top English players in both the doubles disciplines. She is also a former European no. 1 in Women's and Mixed doubles; and once ranked no. 10 in WD and no. 12 in XD at the World level. She won titles in Ireland, Czechia, Mauritius, Iceland and Slovakia and contested in World championships in 1997 and 1999. She also became European Senior Champion in 2006 with her partner Tracey Dineen by defeating Dorota Grzejdak and Bożena Haracz from Poland in the final. After her playing career she coached British players at various levels; Worcestershire County coach, England U-19 National Coach, HPC Coach, GB Youth Olympic Coach, Sydney European Junior Champions Coach 2006, Coach to World Junior Silver Medalist 2007 etc.

Achievements

IBF World Grand Prix
The World Badminton Grand Prix sanctioned by International Badminton Federation (IBF) since 1983.

Mixed doubles

IBF International
Women's doubles

Mixed doubles

References 

1967 births
Living people
English female badminton players